Grafia may refer to:
 Grafia (plant), a genus of plants in the family Apiaceae
 Grafia, a genus of plants in the family Orchidaceae, synonym of Phalaenopsis
 Grafia, a genus of spiders in the family Macrochelidae, synonym of Trigonholaspis